Sapahi is a former Village Development Committee in Dhanusa District besides of ramdaiya village in the Janakpur Zone of south-eastern Nepal. At the time of the 1991 Nepal census it had a population of 6,023 persons residing in 1078 individual households. Sapahi is birthplace and home town of first president of Nepal Ram Baran Yadav.

References

External links
UN map of the municipalities of Dhanusa District

Populated places in Dhanusha District